Boydsville is an unincorporated community in Graves County, Kentucky and Weakley County, Tennessee, in the United States.

History
A post office called Boydsville was established on the Tennessee side in 1837, and remained in operation until it was discontinued in 1853. Abner Boyd, the first postmaster, gave the community its name.

References

Unincorporated communities in Graves County, Kentucky
Unincorporated communities in Weakley County, Tennessee
Unincorporated communities in Kentucky
Unincorporated communities in Tennessee